Mądry (optional feminine: Mądra) is a Polish surname meaning "wise". Gender inflection is optional for the surname (unlike the adjective from which it derives); some women choose to use Mądry instead of Mądra. Mondry is a respelled or dialectal form, as is Mundry. The Czech, Slovak, and Ukrainian cognates are Moudrý, Múdry, and Mudry, respectively.

Notable people with this surname include:

 Ilona Mądra (born 1966), Polish basketball player
 Maria Ilnicka-Mądry (born 1946), Polish politician

See also
 
 

Polish-language surnames